Theo H. Siegrist is an American professor of Biomedical and Chemical Engineering at Florida State University, where he is also affiliated with the National High Magnetic Field Laboratory.  A leading researcher in materials characterization with x-ray diffraction and on the structural analysis of crystalline materials, he was selected as a Research Fellow by the Alexander von Humboldt Foundation in Germany in 2008 and an elected Fellow of the American Physical Society in 2006.  For over 20 years Siegrist served in a research position at Bell Laboratories. where he made contributions in the fields of intermetallic superconductors and organic semiconductors.

References 

Florida State University faculty profile 
Siegrist profile at National High Magnetic Field Laboratory 

Florida State University faculty
Living people
Year of birth missing (living people)